= Melrose House, Nelson =

Coordinates: 41°16′56″S 173°17′04″E

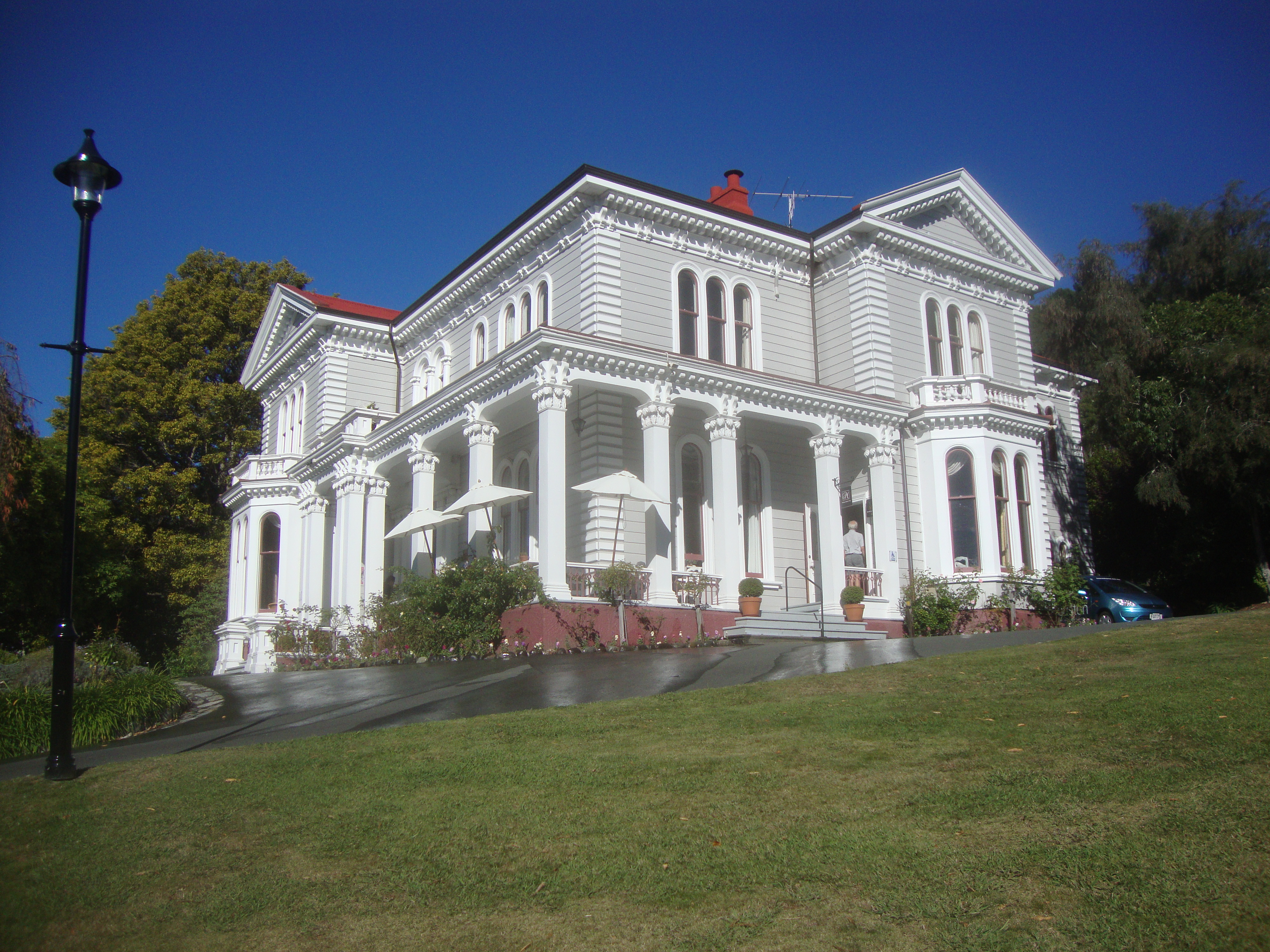
View of Melrose House

Melrose House in 26 Brougham Street, Nelson, New Zealand, is registered with Heritage New Zealand as a category I structure with registration number 259. It was built for Charles Fowell Willet Watts (1823–1881), one of Nelson's earliest settlers.
